Dariusz Olszewski (born 26 November 1967 in Otwock) is a Polish politician. He was elected to the Sejm on 25 September 2005, getting 5797 votes in 20 Warsaw district as a candidate from the Law and Justice list.

See also
Members of Polish Sejm 2005-2007

External links
Dariusz Olszewski - parliamentary page - includes declarations of interest, voting record, and transcripts of speeches.

1967 births
Living people
People from Otwock
Members of the Polish Sejm 2005–2007
Members of the Polish Sejm 2019–2023
Law and Justice politicians